Bharat Jadhav is an actor and producer in Marathi movies, theatre and TV shows in India. He is best known for his comic roles as a leading man in commercial Marathi cinema and theatre. He is one of the most successful actors in the Marathi film industry.

Originally from Kolhapur, his family settled in Mumbai many years ago . Bharat’s childhood was spent in the courtyard (Chal) of Rajaram Studios in Lalbaug Parel.

Bharat Jadhav became famous while acting with Ankush Chaudhari and Sanjay Narvekar in the Marathi stage play "All The Best", which completed 3000 shows. He later acted in the hit Marathi play Sahi re Sahi. His performance in the song Kombadi Palali in the movie Jatra was lauded by fans.

Jadav launched Bharat Jadhav Entertainment Pvt Ltd in 2013. The launch function was attended by Raj Thackeray, Nikhil Wagle, Sachin Pilgaonkar, Mahesh Manjrekar, Siddarth Jadhav, Makarand Anaspure, Jaywant Wadkar, Prachi Cheulkar, Kiran Shantaram, and Anjan Shrivastav.

Career 
As per his website, he has acted in more than 85 movies, 8 serials and been involved in more than 8500 drama shows. He is considered as a close friend of producer and director Kedar Shinde.

Stage plays 
Jadhav began his acting career in 1985 when he joined Maharashtrachi Lokdhara dance troupe, under the guidance of Shahir Sable. He is known for his roles in All the Best, Sahi Re Sahi and Shrimanta Damodar Panta.

Movies 
He has done famous Marathi movies like Jatra, Pachadalela, Masta Chalalay Amacha, Shreemant Damodar Panta (released in 2013), Sat Na Gat (based on a novel by Rajan Khan), One Room Kitchen, Jabardast, Kho-Kho, Khabardar, Shikshanachya Aaicha Gho, Sade Made Teen, No Entry - Pudhe Dhoka Aahe, Agabai Arrecha 2, Davpech and many more. He made a guest appearance in Me Shivaji Raje Boltoy, Agabai Arrecha, Vaastav.

TV shows 
Hasa Chakatfu, Saheb Biwi Ani Me (along with Girish Oak, Neelam Shirke) are famous serials in which he was part of the cast.

In 2016, Bharat hosted a comedy show Aali Lahar Kela Kahar on Colors Marathi.

Filmography

Feature films

Drama 
 Maharashtrachi Lokdhara
 Aamchya Sarkhe Aamhich
 All The Best
 Sahi Re Sahi
 Shreemant Damodar Pant
 Adhantar
 Saujanyachi Aishi Taishi
 Punha Sahi re Sahi

References

External links 
 
 
 
 
 bharatjadhav.com (archived copy)

Jadhav, Bharat
Living people
Marathi actors
Male actors in Marathi theatre
Male actors in Marathi cinema
1973 births
Male actors in Marathi television